The Kveim test, Nickerson-Kveim or Kveim-Siltzbach test is a skin test used to detect sarcoidosis, where part of a spleen from a patient with known sarcoidosis is injected into the skin of a patient suspected to have the disease. If non caseating granulomas are found (4–6 weeks later), the test is positive. If the patient has been on treatment (e.g. glucocorticoids), the test may be false negative. The test is not commonly performed, and in the UK no substrate has been available since 1996. There is a concern that certain infections, such as bovine spongiform encephalopathy, could be transferred through a Kveim test.

It is named for the Norwegian pathologist Morten Ansgar Kveim, who first reported the test in 1941 using lymph node tissue from sarcoidosis patients. It was popularised by the American physician Louis Siltzbach, who introduced a modified form using spleen tissue in 1954. Kveim's work was a refinement of earlier studies performed by Nickerson, who in 1935 first reported on skin reactions in sarcoid.

A Kveim test may be used to distinguish sarcoidosis from conditions with otherwise indistinguishable symptoms such as berylliosis.

References

External links
 

Skin tests